Fernhill railway station is a railway station serving the village of Fernhill in the Cynon Valley, Wales.  It is located on the Aberdare branch of the  Merthyr Line. Passenger services are provided by Transport for Wales.

Services
This drops to hourly in the evenings.

On Sundays there is a general 2-hourly service to Barry Island with an hourly service in the morning and in the late afternoon. This is due to a campaign by the local Assembly Member and a successful trial in December 2017. The extra services began in April 2018.

References

External links

Railway stations in Rhondda Cynon Taf
DfT Category F2 stations
Railway stations opened by British Rail
Railway stations in Great Britain opened in 1988
Railway stations served by Transport for Wales Rail
Mountain Ash, Rhondda Cynon Taf